M68E1 may refer to:
 the M60 Patton tanks 105 mm gun
 a practice version of the M18 Claymore mine